Apollo Records was a Pathe Records subsidiary, based in the United States, briefly issuing records around 1928.

See also
 List of record labels
 Apollo Records (disambiguation), distinguishing among similarly titled companies

References

Defunct record labels of the United States
Record labels established in 1928
American companies established in 1928
Record labels